The Chris Isaak Hour is a one-hour talk show that aired in 2009 on The Biography Channel, in which singer Chris Isaak interviews and plays alongside other musical artists such as Stevie Nicks and Glen Campbell. The channel currently airs re-runs on Thursdays and Saturdays.

Episodes
 Trisha Yearwood (February 26, 2009)
 Stevie Nicks (March 5, 2009)
 Glen Campbell (March 12, 2009)
 Michael Bublé (March 19, 2009)
 Chicago (March 26, 2009)
 The Smashing Pumpkins (April 2, 2009)
 Yusuf Islam (Cat Stevens) (April 9, 2009)
 Jewel  (April 16, 2009)

References

External links
 
 
 Los Angeles Times review

2000s American television talk shows
2009 American television series debuts